Naivasha Constituency is an electoral constituency in Kenya. It is one of eleven constituencies in Nakuru County.  The constituency was established for the 1997 elections.

Members of Parliament

Locations and wards

References

External links 
Map of the constituency

Constituencies in Nakuru County
Constituencies in Rift Valley Province
1997 establishments in Kenya
Constituencies established in 1997